The Aachen Lacquer Shield Owl is a breed of fancy pigeon developed over many years of selective breeding. Aachen Lacquer Shield Owls along with other varieties of domesticated pigeons are all descendants of the rock dove (Columba livia).

See also 
List of pigeon breeds

References 

Pigeon breeds